The Parma is a large stream,  long, that begins in the Tuscan-Emilian Apennine mountains and flows in Parma valley.

Path
It begins from the lake Lago Santo parmense (outflow called Parma di Lago Santo) and small lakes Gemio and Scuro (outflow called Parma di Badignana). After only  Parma di Lago Santo meets Parma di Badignana and then the river takes the name of Parma. It flows through the Province of Parma into Parma, dividing the city in two, and then continues to the Po.

Local names

Lungoparma is the local name for the urban area of the city of Parma along the river.
la Parma is the way parmesans call the stream and its bed (to not to be confused with il Parma, the local name for the Parma F.C.). The reason for the feminine article "la" is that in parmesan dialect a stream is feminine.
la Parma voladora indicates the Parma stream in full flood.

References
Information for this article was taken from the Italian and French versions.

Rivers of Italy
Rivers of the Province of Parma
Rivers of the Apennines